APS Polytechnic is located at Somanahalli, Bangalore, India. It celebrates golden jubilee in 2008. The polytechnic was founded by Sri Ananthachar.It is situated in Somanahalli Gate popularly that stop is known as KEB and also APS Engineering Campus is also located beside a kilometer from Polytechnic Campus

References
Government of Karnataka, Department of Technical Education
APS College of Engineering - APS Educational Trust

Universities and colleges in Bangalore
1958 establishments in Mysore State
Educational institutions established in 1958
Technical universities and colleges in Karnataka